Golden Sings That Have Been Sung is the third studio album by American musician Ryley Walker. It was released in August 2016 under Dead Oceans Records.

Critical reception

The album received a Metacritic score of 80 based on 16 critics, indicating generally favorable reviews.

Track listing

Personnel
Adapted from Discogs.

Ryley Walker – Acoustic Guitar, Vocals
LeRoy Bach – Acoustic Guitar, Electric Guitar, Keyboards [Keys], Piano, Clarinet, Percussion, Lap Steel Guitar, Production
Anton Hatwich – Bass
Frank Rosaly, Quin Kirchner, Ryan Jewell – Drums
Brian Sulpizio – Electric Guitar
Ben Boye – Keyboards [Keys], Piano, Autoharp
Whitney Johnson – Viola

Technical
Artwork – Brian Blomerth
Design – Miles Johnson
Engineer – Cooper Crain
Engineer [Additional Engineering] – Matt Dewine
Engineer [Additional Engineering] – LeRoy Bach
Mastered By – Jeff Lipton
Mastered By [Assistant Mastering Engineer] – Maria Rice
Mixed By – Brian Deck
Producer, Arranged By – LeRoy Bach, Ryley Walker

Weekly charts

References

2016 albums
Dead Oceans albums
Ryley Walker albums